The Witter Bynner Poetry Prize was established by the American Academy and Institute of Arts and Letters in 1980 to support the work of a young poet.  It is named for poet Witter Bynner. The prize was discontinued in 2003. It is not to be confused with the Witter Bynner Prize for undergraduate excellence in poetry, administered in the 1920s by the Poetry Society of America and Palms magazine.

Winners
Winners of the prize are as follows:

2002—Susan Wheeler
2001—Rachel Wetzsteon
2000—Dana Levin
1999—Brigit Pegeen Kelly
1998—Elizabeth Spires
1997—Mark Doty
1996—Lucie Brock-Broido
1995—Franz Wright
1994—Rosanna Warren
1993—Patricia Storace
1992—George Bradley
1991—Thylias Moss
1990—Jacqueline Osherow
1989—Mary Jo Salter
1988—Andrew Hudgins
1987—Antler
1986—C.D. Wright
1985—J.D. McClatchy
1984—Henry Taylor
1983—Douglas Crase
1982—William Heyen
1981—Allen Grossman
1980—Pamela White Hadas

References

See also
Witter Bynner Fellowships
American poetry
List of poetry awards
List of literary awards
List of years in poetry
List of years in literature

American poetry awards